Jassim Mohammed (born 10 June 1984 in Nasiriyah, Iraq) is an Iraqi footballer who plays as a striker for Al-Shorta in the Iraq Premier League, as well as the Iraq national team.

International career
On 24 July 2016, Jassim made his first international cap with Iraq against Uzbekistan in a friendly match.

Iraq national team goals 
Scores and results list Iraq's goal tally first.

References

External links 
 

1984 births
Living people
People from Nasiriyah
Al-Mina'a SC players
Iraqi footballers
Iraq international footballers
Al-Shorta SC players
Association football forwards